Fenerbahçe Ülker is the professional men's basketball department of Fenerbahçe S.K., a major multisport club based in Istanbul, Turkey.

For the season roster: 2009-10 Roster

Group A regular season
The Regular Season began on October 15, 2009, and concluded on January 14, 2010.

Fixtures/results

All times given below are in Central European Time.

Unless otherwise indicated, all attendance totals are from the corresponding match report posted on the official Euroleague site and included with each game summary.

External links
Official Fenerbahçe site 
Fenerbahçe Ulker 
Euro League Page 
TBLStat.net 
Euroleague Format
Euroleague.net
Fenerbahçe fansite

References

2009-10
2009–10 Euroleague by club
2009–10 in Turkish basketball by club